Vinci Da is a 2019 Indian Bengali psychological thriller film directed by Srijit Mukherji, under the banner of SVF Entertainment Pvt Ltd, starring Rudranil Ghosh, Ritwick Chakraborty, Anirban Bhattacharya, Riddhi Sen, Gautam Moitra and Sohini Sarkar.

Plot
The story is narrated by Vinci da (Rudranil Ghosh) who learned the art of making prosthetics from his father. The movie starts with the then eighteen year old Adi Bose's (Riddhi Sen) father drunkenly beating his mother. He asks his father to stop but he doesn't. Tired of the everyday disquietude, he beats him dead with his cricket bat. He calls the police and ends up in the asylum. Meanwhile, Vinci da's father dies and he finds it problematic to earn a living because Tollywood doesn't appreciate his talent. His love interest, Jaya, (Sohini Sarkar) is a stutterer.

Adi Bose, now an adult (Ritwick Chakraborty), has been released from prison. He believes himself to be a 'serial lawyer,' by committing the crimes previously done by criminals he apparently delivers justice. To carry out his heinous plans in a more effective way, he approaches Vinci da as a director, and tricks him into making the mask of businessman, Shyam Sundar Jaiswal, (Bharat Kaul) who was acquitted from court in a Rs. 2500 crore scam. Adi Bose wears his mask, goes and robs a bank, and kills a security guard. Jaiswal is arrested. Vinci da realises the truth the next day when he sees the news. He is distraught. The only thing that comes to his mind is the innocent security guard. He could not believe that art can be used for crime. Sensing his reluctance to make more prosthetic masks, Adi Bose blackmails him with the videos he had taken while Vinci da was creating the first mask.

Vinci da is blackmailed into creating the mask of a politician's son who was acquitted even after driving his car on homeless people. Adi Bose drives a car on people sleeping on the footpath wearing the mask, and frames the politician's son. Vinci da is filled with grief and self-hatred after meeting the son of one of homeless people killed in the massacre. He tries to convince Adi Bose that he is not a part of these crimes but Adi Bose thinks otherwise.

In the last and third instance, Vinci da makes the mask of a rapist. Adi Bose wears the mask, kidnaps a girl from the road, rapes her, films the whole incident, and releases the clip to the media. The rapist, previously acquitted, is arrested and imprisoned. Tragedy strikes when Vinci da finds that the girl raped is none other than Jaya. He is distraught. Jaya attempts suicide but is saved by Vinci da. Planning revenge, he meets Adi Bose at his home and poisons him. Wearing a mask resembling Adi Bose, he shoots a video proclaiming that he is taking his own life.

However, inspector Bijoy Poddar (Anirban Bhattacharya) had met Adi Bose in the beginning of the movie, and viewing the suicide clip could detect the difference in the voices of actual Adi Bose and the one recorded in the suicide clip. He discovers the videos recorded by Adi Bose of Vinci da at his home, and orders his arrest.

By this time, Vinci da and Jaya have fled the city, disguised as an old couple.

Cast
 Rudranil Ghosh as Vinci Da
 Ritwick Chakraborty Adi Bose 
 Anirban Bhattacharya as DCDD Bijoy Poddar 
 Sohini Sarkar as Jaya
 Bharat Kaul as Shyam Sundar Jaiswal
 Aryann Roy as Manas Saha
 Srijit Mukherji as School Principal 
 Gautam Moitra - As criminal lawyer
 Riddhi Sen as Jr. Adi Bose (Special appearance)

Soundtrack

All songs written and composed by Anupam Roy and background music scored by Indraadip Dasgupta.

Reception

Critical response 

Debolina Sen of The Times of India scored the film at 3.5 out of 5 stars and says "For a film that keeps you impressed with the rapid pace all throughout, it does have a predictable ending. Vinci Da is at best an interesting crime film, which has dollops of drama in the screenplay."The New Indian Express wrote "Vinci Da" breaks every glass ceiling that the 'thriller' genre in India has ever encountered and savours the shards as they penetrate the very core of the concept of crime and atonement."Business Standard wrote "Vinci Da" is a remarkable work for the way it blurs the lines of morality to show how easily a clever man can jump from the right side to the wrong. And how weak can be manipulated by the strong. It's also remarkable for showing the close relationship between crime and art, and between the criminal and his conscience."

References

External links 
 

Bengali-language Indian films
2010s Bengali-language films
2019 films
2019 thriller films
Bengali films remade in other languages
Films about law enforcement
Films directed by Srijit Mukherji
Films scored by Anupam Roy
Indian thriller films
Indian psychological thriller films